Central Park North is a 1969 big band jazz album recorded by the Thad Jones/Mel Lewis Jazz Orchestra and released on the Solid State Records label.  The album was nominated for a 1969 Grammy award in the "Best Instrumental Jazz Performance - Large Group..." category.  All tracks are also included on Mosaic's limited edition boxed set, The Complete Solid State Recordings of the Thad Jones/Mel Lewis Orchestra.

Track listing 

All songs composed and arranged by Thad Jones except where indicated.

LP side A:
 "Tow Away Zone" – 4:25
 "Quietude" – 4:03
 "Jive Samba" (Nat Adderley) – 8:50
LP side B:
 "The Groove Merchant" (Jerome Richardson) – 5:04
 "Big Dipper" – 5:52
 "Central Park North" – 9:14

Personnel 
 Thad Jones – flugelhorn
 Mel Lewis – drums
 Roland Hanna – piano
 Richard Davis – bass
 Barry Galbraith – guitar
 Sam Brown – guitar
 Jerome Richardson – alto saxophone
 Jerry Dodgion – alto saxophone
 Joe Farrell – tenor saxophone
 Eddie Daniels – tenor saxophone
 Joe Temperley – baritone saxophone
 Snooky Young – trumpet
 Richard Williams – trumpet
 Danny Moore – trumpet
 Jimmy Nottingham – trumpet
 Jimmy Knepper – trombone
 Benny Powell – trombone
 Eddie Bert – trombone
 Cliff Heather – trombone

References and external Links 

 Solid State SS-18058
 Central Park North at:
 [ Allmusic]
discogs.com

The Thad Jones/Mel Lewis Orchestra albums
1969 albums
Solid State Records (jazz label) albums
Albums produced by Sonny Lester